The A9 is a major road in Scotland running from the Falkirk council area in central Scotland to Scrabster Harbour, Thurso in the far north, via Stirling, Bridge of Allan, Perth and Inverness. At , it is the longest road in Scotland and the fifth-longest A-road in the United Kingdom. Historically it was the main road between Edinburgh and John o' Groats, and has been called the spine of Scotland. It is one of the three major north–south trunk routes linking the Central Belt to the Highlands - the others being the A82 and the A90.

The road's origins lie in the military roads building programme of the 18th century, further supplemented by the building of several bridges in later years. The A9 route was formally designated in 1923, and originally ran from Edinburgh to Inverness. The route was soon extended north from Inverness up to John O'Groats. By the 1970s the route was hampered by severe traffic congestion, and an extensive upgrading programme was undertaken on the  section between Bridge of Allan and Inverness.

In the south the road's importance has been eclipsed by:
 the A90 across the Forth Road Bridge and the M90 motorway, which now link Edinburgh more directly with Perth, bypassing Stirling and Bridge of Allan as formerly important bridge points, and
 the M9, which is now the main road between Edinburgh and Stirling/Bridge of Allan.

Between Edinburgh and Falkirk the old A9 route has been reclassified into the A803 and the B9080 amongst others; part of the route between Kirkliston and Maybury no longer exists as the area is now part of Edinburgh Airport. Between Falkirk and Bridge of Allan, the A9 survives as a more or less parallel road to the M9.

The link between the M9 and the A9, by Bridge of Allan, is the Keir Roundabout.

History
 The A9's origins lie in the military roads building programme carried out by General Wade in the 18th century to allow deployment of forces in key locations within the Highlands. At this time there was already an existing road between Perth and Dunkeld, and between 1727 and 1730 a roadway was constructed between Dunkeld in Perthshire and Inverness.

However, Wade had still to bridge the River Tay at Aberfeldy. Construction began in 1733 to a design by William Adam. The bridge was completed within the year, but Wade wrote "The Bridge of Tay... was a work of great difficulty and also much more expensive than was calculated." At a cost of over £4,000, the bridge became the most expensive item on Wade's road building programme. For most of its length between Perth and Inverness, the route was identical to the A9 prior to the commencement of the major upgrading works in the 1970s.

 In 1802, Thomas Telford was requested by the Lords of the Treasury to carry out a survey of the interior of the Scottish Highlands. In his report, he highlighted the inadequacy of the old military roads to meet the requirements of the general population. In particular, he noted the difficulties caused by the absence of bridges over some of the principal rivers. As part of the improvements to the road system that were carried out in the following years, a bridge was built at Dunkeld, designed by Telford. The original cost estimate was £15,000 with costs to be split between the government and the landowner, the 4th Duke of Atholl. However, costs spiralled up to around £40,000. The government refused to increase their financial contribution, so the Duke of Atholl had to finance the extra cost. As a result, tolls were placed on the completed bridge to recoup costs. The realigned road north out of Dunkeld would evolve eventually into the A9, and the bridge carried the bulk of the traffic into the Highlands until the new A9 by-pass was opened in 1977.

The formal scheme of classification of roads in Great Britain (England, Scotland, and Wales) was first published on 1 April 1923. The original route of the designated A9 began in Edinburgh at the Corstorphine junction in the west of the city, branching north off the A8. The route went through Kirkliston and onwards to Polmont and Falkirk. The road then followed the now familiar route to Stirling and then up to Perth and onwards to Inverness, going through numerous villages en route. The original A9 terminated at Inverness, but in the years that followed it was extended to include the roadway all the way up to John O'Groats. By the 1970s, the A9 went north-west out of Inverness in what had originally been classified as the A88, following the Beauly Firth coast westwards through Kirkhill, Beauly and Muir of Ord. Continuing north through Dingwall, the road then began to follow the Cromarty Firth coast, where it followed largely the modern alignment, going through Alness and Tain (both now bypassed). The A9 from here followed west along the south side of the Dornoch Firth coast before reaching Bonar Bridge where the road turned sharply eastwards on the north side of the Dornoch Firth. On reaching the village of Dornoch, the A9 headed north along the coast, going through several villages before reaching the town of Wick. The final stretch continued north along the coast before it finally reached John O'Groats.

Upgrades
The  section between Bridge of Allan and Inverness, via Perth, was substantially rebuilt during the 1970s and 80s, but it follows essentially the same route except where it bypasses towns and villages instead of running through their centres. Between Perth and Inverness, the road has been dubbed Killer A9, because of accidents and fatalities where dual-carriageway sections merge into a single-carriageway - the principal cause being motorists driving at excessive speeds to overtake lines of slower-moving vehicles before the dual carriageway ends. Dangerous overtaking manoeuvres on the long single-carriageway stretches of the road are also common causes of accidents, as are the non-grade separated junctions along the northern sections, where drivers make a right turn across the opposing traffic flow.

 The most significant alteration of the A9 route was the realignment of the route north from Inverness, crossing the Moray Firth via the Kessock Bridge, cutting through the Black Isle and back across the Cromarty Firth. Construction of the Kessock Bridge began in 1976 and it was completed in 1982.

Since 2007, the Scottish Government has given serious consideration to converting the entire Perth-Inverness section to dual carriageway with more grade separated junctions, with the initial estimated cost at £600 million. In late 2008, the Scottish Government's transport plan for the next 20 years was announced. It brought forward planned improvements to the A9 in an attempt to stimulate the economy and protect jobs. Work costing a total of £8.5 million was undertaken at Moy, Carrbridge and Bankfoot. Northbound overtaking lanes were created and the carriageway was reconstructed at both Moy and Carrbridge. Junction improvements were also made at Moy and at the Ballinluig junction, south of Pitlochry.

In November 2011, the Scottish Government announced that it would upgrade the entire road from Perth to Inverness to dual carriageway. The design contract was split into three lots with Lot 1 (Glengarry to Dalraddy) awarded to a CH2MHill/Fairhurst joint venture in April 2014. Lot 2 (Pass of Birnam to Glengarry) was awarded to Jacobs in August 2014 and Lot 3 was awarded to an Atkins/Mouchel joint venture in December 2014. Award of the construction contract for a preliminary section (outwith Lots 1 to 3) of the £3 billion project was awarded in June 2015, and work began on the  section between Kincraig and Dalraddy (just south of Aviemore) in September 2015. After a slight delay, this section was opened to traffic on 30 September 2017. The full scheme is scheduled to be completed in 2025.

In July 2013, the Scottish Government announced a plan to install average speed cameras on the A9 between Perth and Inverness. This has been undertaken with an aim to reduce accidents and fatalities on the road, and was the second permanent average speed camera scheme in Scotland. Simultaneously, an increased speed limit for heavy goods vehicles from 40mph to 50mph was introduced to help mitigate driver frustration. The cameras became operational in October 2014. The A9 Safety Group claim that the cameras have had a "positive influence" on road users, with the number of drivers breaking the speed limit by over 10mph decreasing by 97%. Improvements to safety include at least 40% reduction in fatalities, and this has been attributed, at least in part, to a reduction in speeding, from 1 in 3 vehicles to just 1 in 15.

A study in 2016 found that the dualling project would cost more to construct than it would bring in, including wider economic benefits.

Plans to dual the A9 and A96 have been criticised by Patrick Harvie of the Scottish Greens, who has said the plans are incompatible with the Scottish Government's climate initiatives.

The A9 runs through the site of the Battle of Killiecrankie. Expanding the road here will destroy some of the battleground. Transport Scotland say dualling the road will have "some impact" on the site.

Route

The original starting section of the A9 between Edinburgh and Polmont no longer exists as such, having been reclassified over the years in a variety of ways; part of the original route between Kirkliston and Maybury no longer exists at all as the area is now part of Edinburgh Airport. The modern A9 begins at the M9 junction 5 (Cadgers Brae) on the outskirts of Polmont, just east of Falkirk, and continues through Falkirk itself and on though Larbert, Stirling and Bridge of Allan. It then becomes a primary route dual carriageway at the Keir Roundabout, just south of Dunblane, and continues north as a dual carriageway to Perth bypassing Dunblane, Blackford and Auchterarder.

At Broxden Junction on the outskirts of Perth, the A9 meets the M90 motorway which carries traffic from Fife and the Forth Road Bridge. Broxden Junction is one of the busiest and most important road junctions in Scotland, with links to all seven Scottish cities.

The section between Perth and Inverness is often cited as being the most dangerous section of the road, and regularly appears in lists of Scotland's most dangerous roads. This portion of the road is mostly single-carriageway, however there are intermittent short sections of dual carriageway from Perth to Birnam, Pitlochry to Killiecrankie, south of Drumochter Summit, Slochd Summit to Tomatin and south of Inverness as well as shorter three lane overtaking sections to reduce frustration and accidents. All the towns on this section of the route have now been bypassed.

The section from Keir Roundabout to Inverness had average speed cameras installed in 2014 and at the same time the single carriageway speed limit for HGVs was increased from 40 mph to 50 mph.

In the north, beyond Inverness, the A9 designation has been transferred in response to construction of new bridges across the Moray Firth (the Kessock Bridge), the Cromarty Firth and the Dornoch Firth; and so that the A9 leads not to John o' Groats but to Scrabster Harbour, Thurso, where a government-supported ferry service takes traffic to and from Stromness in Orkney. Therefore, various towns and villages which were on the A9 are now seriously distanced from this trunk road.

Between Perth and Inverness, the A9 forms part of Euroroute E15.  Inverness is the northern terminus of this route.

From Falkirk to Bridge of Allan the A9 runs through or near Bannockburn, Plean, Torwood, Larbert and Stirling.

From Bridge of Allan to Inverness the A9 runs through or near Lecropt, Dunblane,  Blackford, Auchterarder, Gleneagles, Broxden Junction, Perth, Birnam, Dunkeld, Pitlochry, Blair Atholl, the Grampian Mountains, Dalwhinnie, Newtonmore, Kingussie, Aviemore, Carrbridge, Tomatin and Moy.

From Inverness the A9 runs across, through or near the Moray Firth, the Black Isle, Tore, Muir of Ord, Conon Bridge, the Cromarty Firth, Easter Ross, Dingwall, Evanton, Alness, Invergordon, Nigg Bay, Fearn, Tain, the Dornoch Firth, Sutherland, Dornoch, The Mound, Golspie, Dunrobin Castle, Brora, Helmsdale, Caithness,  Berriedale (and the Berriedale Braes), Badbea, Dunbeath, Latheron, Mybster,
Georgemas and Thurso. The road ends at Scrabster Harbour, Thurso.

From the A96 in the Raigmore area of Inverness the A9 has junctions with other classified roads as follows:

 In the Inverness area:
 The A96 at Raigmore interchange (Ordnance Survey ).
 The A82 at Longman roundabout in the Longman area. Just north of this junction the Kessock Bridge carries the A9 over the Moray Firth to the Black Isle.
 The B865 at Inshes

 On the Black Isle:
 The B9161.
 At Tore, near Muir of Ord and Conon Bridge:
 The A832 and the A835. The A832 and the A835 meet the A9 at the same roundabout, at Tore. The A832 links Muir of Ord with the A9. The A835 links Conon Bridge.
 The B9169.
 The B9163. Just north of this junction the A9 bridges the Cromarty Firth to reach Easter Ross.
 In Easter Ross:
 Near Dingwall:
 The A862.
 In the Evanton, Alness, Invergordon area:
 The B817. The B817 runs through Evanton, Alness and Invergordon. The A9 alignment here is more west–east than south–north. Evanton and Alness are north of the A9. Invergordon is to the south.
 The B9176. The B9176 road runs to A836 near Bonar Bridge.
 The B817.
 The B817.
 Near Nigg Bay
 The B9175 - for Nigg Ferry and, in the summer, a vehicle ferry for Cromarty.
 Near Hill of Fearn:
 The B9165. Fearn railway station is on the B9165, about one mile (1.6 km) east of the A9.
 Near Tain:
 The B9174.
 The B9174 ).
 The A836. Just north of this junction the A9 bridges the Dornoch Firth.

 In Sutherland:
 The A949. Skibo Castle is on the A949 which is the 3rd and final junction that runs through to Bonar Bridge 
 Near Dornoch:
 The A949.
 The B9168.
 At The Mound, near Rogart:
 The A839. Rogart railway station is on the A839. From the Mound the A9 runs through or past Golspie, Dunrobin Castle and Brora before meeting another classified road, in Helmsdale.
 In Helmsdale:
 The A897. From Helmsdale the A9 runs through Berriedale and Dunbeath before meeting another classified road, at Latheron, Caithness.

 In Caithness:
 At Latheron:
 The A99.
 At Mybster:
 B870.
 In the Georgemas area:
 The A882.
 The B874.
 In Thurso:
 The A836.
 The B874.
 The A836.

The A9 ends in Thurso, at Scrabster Harbour.

Junction list

References

External links

Scottish Roads Archive - The A9 - Falkirk to Thurso
Society for All British Road Enthusiasts entry for the A9
National Library of Scotland: Scottish Screen Archive (1982 documentary about the reconstruction of the A9 between Perth and Inverness)
Transport Scotland - A9 dualling Perth to Inverness

Highlands and Islands of Scotland
Roads in Scotland
Scenic routes in the United Kingdom
Transport in Falkirk (council area)
Transport in Highland (council area)
Transport in Perth and Kinross
Transport in Stirling (council area)